Svajūnas Jonauskas (born 2 January 1995) is a Lithuanian racing cyclist. He rode in the men's sprint event at the 2018 UCI Track Cycling World Championships.

References

1995 births
Living people
Lithuanian male cyclists
Place of birth missing (living people)
European Games competitors for Lithuania
Cyclists at the 2019 European Games